The red-banded fruiteater (Pipreola whitelyi) is a species of bird in the family Cotingidae. Its known range is restricted to the humid highland forests of the tepuis in the southeast of Venezuela and western Guyana. While likely present, it remains unconfirmed in adjacent parts of northern Brazil. The International Union for Conservation of Nature has rated its conservation status as being of "least concern".

Uniquely among the fruiteaters, the underparts of the male are primarily grey. As suggested by its common name, the male also has a conspicuous red pectoral collar.

Description

The adult male has greyish-green upper parts with a distinctive long golden stripe that runs above the eye and round the ear-coverts. The chin and belly are grey and there is a broad, orange-red chest collar, and yellowish-ochre under-tail coverts. The female has similar head markings, a yellowish patch at the side of the neck, and moss-green upper parts. There is no chest collar and the underparts are greyish-white, boldly streaked with black. The beak and legs are pinkish-grey; the male has an orange iris and the female's is ochre. The song, a high-pitched hissing trill lasting for several seconds, is seldom uttered.

Distribution and habitat
The red-banded fruiteater is found in the tropical forests of Guyana and Venezuela.

Ecology
This bird feeds on fruit in the tree canopy, sometimes visiting forest verges (at which times it is easier to observe), but more often remaining elusive in the woodland interior. It is a lethargic bird usually seen singly or in pairs, but sometimes forming part of mixed flocks of fruiteaters. The fruits on which it feeds are mainly consumed while hovering briefly, but sometimes the bird perches while feeding.

Status
Although the population size of the red-banded fruiteater is unknown, it is believed to be stable and the bird does not face any particular threats. Its range is large but it is generally described as being uncommon. The International Union for Conservation of Nature has assessed its conservation status as being of "least concern", believing that it does not qualify on the range size or total population criteria for inclusion in a more threatened category.

References

External links
Red-banded Fruiteater videos on the Internet Bird Collection
Photo-High Res; Article tropicalbirding
Photo; Article fieldguides

red-banded fruiteater
Birds of the Tepuis
red-banded fruiteater
Taxa named by Frederick DuCane Godman
Taxa named by Osbert Salvin
Taxonomy articles created by Polbot